The Castle of Torre-estrella (Spanish: Castillo de Torre-estrella) is a castle located in Medina Sidonia, Spain. It was declared Bien de Interés Cultural in 1993.

References 

Bien de Interés Cultural landmarks in the Province of Cádiz
Castles in Andalusia